Amores, querer con alevosía is a Mexican telenovela that originally aired on Azteca Trece from January 15, 2001 to June 22, 2001. The telenovela was created by Bernardo Romero Pereiro and Jimena Romero for the company TV Azteca. It stars by Bárbara Mori and Christian Meier.

Plot 
This is a love story in which there are different ways of feeling it. Carolina belongs to a middle-class family. She lives with her parents and her two sisters and she has a boyfriend named Mario. In college, he accidentally meets Pablo, a young man who appears in an affair with his girlfriend. Their encounter is not so kind and ends with a battle, but in spite of this, there is certainly a great attraction between them, which seems to be the love of the first glance. Guillermo, father of Pablo, has a problem with the magazines that publishes his publishing house, so they decide to make a contract with the young people and publish a magazine for them. Among them, he meets with Carolina, who during his return to see Pablo initiates a powerful war without realizing that in fact they are in love.

Cast

Starring 
 Bárbara Mori as Carolina Morales
 Christian Meier as Pablo Herreros

Also starring 
 Juan Manuel Bernal as Mario Rodríguez
 Miguel Ángel Ferriz as Arturo Morales
 Paloma Woolrich as Belinda de Morales
 Fernando Becerril as Guillermo Herreros
 Patricia Bernal as Susana de Herreros
 Daniel Martínez as Iván
 Carmen Beato as Ángela
 Francisco de la O as Felipe Montero
 Carlos Torrestorija as Fernando
 Dino García as Ignacio Orozco
 Gabriela de la Garza as Carmela Villalonga
 Elizabeth Cervantes as Matilde Morales
 Irene Azuela as Rocío Morales
 Mariana Isla as Pilar Sánchez
 Carla Rodríguez as Consuelo
 Eduardo Victoria as Antonio Redondo
 León Michel as Julián
 Lariza Mendizábal as Beatriz Quintana
 Carmen Perkins as Mercedes Quintana
 Jorge Levy as Alberto Ruíz
 Jorge Galván as Ricardo
 Saby Kamalich as Cristina

Recurring 
 Plutarco Haza as Salvador
 Héctor Bonilla as Padre Corona
 Jesús Ochoa as Miguel Ángel

References

External links 
 

2001 telenovelas
2001 Mexican television series debuts
2001 Mexican television series endings
TV Azteca telenovelas
Mexican telenovelas